Juan Carlos Leyrado Ravecca (born August 18, 1951) is an Argentine actor. He took part in the incredibly successful 2012 Argentine telenovela Graduados.

Works

Television
 Yosi, the Regretful Spy
 Educando a Nina
 El maestro
 Un gallo para esculapio
 La Caida
 Aliados
 Graduados
 El hombre de tu vida
 Los cuentos de Fontanarrosa
 Mujeres asesinas
 Gladiadores de Pompeya
 Tiempo final
 Los machos de América
 Tres padres solteros
 Maridos a domicilio
 Gasoleros
 La hermana mayor
 Alta comedia
 Atreverse
 Dos vidas y un destino
 Tato Bores
 Situación límite
 El trópico del cangrejo
 Amores
 Desde adentro
 Plomera de mi barrio
 Mía solo mía
 Con pecado concebidas
 Tres minas infieles
 Nosotros y los miedos
 Matrimonios y algo más
 Compromisos
 Galería

Film
 Motivos para no enamorarse (2008)
 Matar a Videla (2007)
 Cómplices del silencio (2007)
 Maradona, la mano de Dios (2007)
 Iluminados por el fuego (2005)
 Paco Urondo, la palabra justa (2004)
 Cruz de sal (2003)
 El día que me amen (2003)
 Chiquititas: Rincón de luz (2001)
 Antigua vida mía (2001)
 Mar de amores (1998)
 Despabílate amor (1996)
 Picado fino (1993)
 Vivir mata (1991)
 Lo que vendrá (1988)
 Memorias y olvidos (1987)
 Revancha de un amigo (1987)
 Tacos altos (1985)
 Los insomnes (1984)
 Asesinato en el Senado de la Nación (1984)
 Atrapadas (1984)
 Los chicos de la guerra (1984)
 Camila (1984)
 Los enemigos (1983)
 La casa de las siete tumbas (1982)
 Subí que te llevo (1980)
 Desde el abismo (1980)

Theater
 Baraka
 Ella en mi cabeza
 Cabaret Bijou
 Cyrano de Bergerac
 Velázquez
 Nacida Ayer
 Hombres
 Ciclo Nueva Armonía
 Los Lobos
 Los Mosqueteros
 Rumores
 Camino Negro
 Luv
 La señorita de Tacna
 El burlador de Sevilla
 Feria del miedo, del amor y de la guerra
 Tres hermanas
 Un tranvía llamado deseo
 Aquí no podemos hacerlo
 Madre Coraje
 Bent
 Israfel
 Nuestro pueblo
 Atendiendo al Sr Sloane
 Dios Mio

Awards

Nominations
 2013 Martín Fierro Awards
 Best actor of miniseries

References

External links
 

Argentine male actors
People from Buenos Aires
1952 births
Living people